Hazel Renee is an American actress, recording artist, and TV personality.

During season 3 she had a recurring role on the FOX TV Show Empire.

Career
Hazel gained notice as an actress in 2013 when she became a cast member for a webisode titled, “The Marriage Tour” by David Tinsley.

In Spring 2017, she landed her first big recurring role in Season 3 of the FOX TV Series Empire in the role of “Kennedy”. She first appeared in Episode 12, “Strange Bedfellows”, which was viewed by 6.35 million viewers. She then appeared again in Episode 13, “My Naked Villainy”, where she inspires Hakeem's song, “Special”.

This same year she was also connected to the Bravo reality show The Real Housewives of Atlanta during Season 9, as the musical friend of Kandi Burruss. She also is a part of the recurring cast of the VH1 reality series Basketball Wives.

Personal life 
She was in a relationship with basketball player Jacob Pullen, and has one daughter, Olive, with him. In 2018, Hazel dated NBA player Draymond Green, who has one child prior to their relationship. Hazel and Green were engaged in 2019. Their daughter was born in 2020. They held their wedding ceremony on August 14, 2022 in Malibu.

References

External links

Living people
Participants in American reality television series
American people of Filipino descent
Actresses from Kansas
Hip hop models
1988 births
American people of Puerto Rican descent
Basketball players' wives and girlfriends